The mottled tuco-tuco (Ctenomys latro) is a species of rodent in the family Ctenomyidae. It is endemic to Argentina. Its natural habitat is subtropical or tropical dry lowland grassland.

References

Tuco-tucos
Mammals of Argentina
Endemic fauna of Argentina
Mammals described in 1918
Taxa named by Oldfield Thomas
Taxonomy articles created by Polbot